The Rubenstein Kiss is the debut play by British playwright James Phillips, and the winner of the John Whiting Award and the TMA Award for Best New Play.

The play, set in the 1950s and the 1970s, was inspired by an iconic photograph of the nuclear spies Julius and Ethel Rosenberg. It was premiered at the Hampstead Theatre, London in 2005, starring Samantha Bond, Will Keen, Gary Kemp and Martin Hutson.

The play had its North American premiere on February 3, 2012, in Columbus, Ohio.

References

2005 plays
2000s debut plays